Paul Hodkinson (born 14 September 1965 in Kirkby, Liverpool, England) is a former professional boxer. Hodkinson fought at Featherweight and is the former British, European and World (WBC) Featherweight Title holder.

Amateur career
Paul Hodkinson first caught the eye as an amateur bantamweight in the 1984-85 season with a series of good displays for young England and later for the full international side; but John Davidson a hard hitting and mature Northerner proved a little too rugged for him and Hodkinson’s ABA title campaign came to an abrupt finish in the first round.

The one round defeat prompted a rethink in the Kirkby club - whose ‘old boys’ included John Conteh and Joey Singleton - and Hodkinson decided it was time to stop fighting the scales and let his body find its true poundage. As a featherweight the improvement was instantaneous. He had an excellent 
1986 ABA title campaign winning the Amateur Boxing Association British featherweight title, when boxing out of the Kirkby ABC and he swept aside all comers in capturing his club's first national title since Conteh's success in 1971.

With the 1986 Commonwealth Games taking place in the summer, Hodkinson was an automatic selection and in most experts' view a clear favourite for the featherweight gold. Hodkinson had other ideas, he had already decided to turn pro. His amateur days ended in acrimony with him being ‘expelled’ from the games panel for failing to report for training. He was in America where he was given the chance to spar with some of the top fighters in the world. Hodkinson had sparred with six world champions in the shape of Sot Chitalada, Hilario Zapata, Bernardo Pinango, Barry McGuigan, Brian Mitchell and Antonio Esparragoza.

Professional career
Hodkinson turned professional with BJ Eastwood and the new team was launched at Wembley Stadium on the night Frank Bruno was beaten by Tim Witherspoon, fighting in front of the biggest live audience in decades. Hodkinson beat Mark Champney in two rounds to get his career underway. Hodkinson stopped his first seven opponents inside the distance, his most memorable win coming against former British Featherweight champion Steve Sims in the King’s Hall in Belfast.

In July 1987 the same year he was voted Grandstand’s Young Prospect of The Year, a title he shared with Gary Stretch. Hodkinson travelled to Panama with BJ Eastwood where he sparred with Brian Mitchell for three weeks preparing the WBA Super-featherweight king for his defence against local favourite Rocky Fernandez. Hodkinson fought and drew with Tomas Arguelles on the under card. The Panamanian was Hodkinson’s toughest opponent to date but many neutral observers felt the young Liverpudlian came out on the wrong end of a ‘home town’ decision. Hodkinson was quick to avenge the only blemish on his record when he stopped Arguelles in six rounds the following October.

After beating the capable Dubliner Ritchie Foster in three rounds Hoko went to Wales to challenge Peter Harris for the British Featherweight title in just his 12th professional contest. He won the title and successfully defended it, stopping Kevin Taylor in two rounds in December 1988. By April the following year Hodkinson had beaten Frenchman Raymond Armand to win the vacant European title in two rounds, and won a Lonsdale belt outright when he stopped Peter Harris, defending his British title.

Hodkinson then defended his European title against rugged Frenchman Farid Benredjeb. Like Peter Harris the ‘teak-tough’ Algerian had never been stopped or been on the canvas before meeting Hodkinson and his French handlers, the Acaries brothers considered Benredjeb to be un-stoppable. Showing what an exciting fighter he is, Hodkinson put on a display of powerful combination punching with great accuracy and hand speed to stop the challenger. Hodkinson had outclassed the best in Europe and was ready to fight at the highest level. In March 1990 at the G-Mex Manchester Hodkinson fought in a world title final eliminator when he stopped Mexican Eduardo Montoya in three rounds, but not before he was on the canvas himself for the first time in his professional career. In the first round Hodkinson had the Mexican down twice and moved in to finish when Montoya was apparently there for the taking. Carelessly Hodkinson was caught by a sucker right hand and paid the penalty. The Mexican wasn’t in as much trouble as he appeared to be in, and Hodkinson, misjudged the situation as did everyone else in the audience.

Unbeaten in 18 contests (17 stoppages) Hodkinson then fought for the vacant WBC featherweight title against Marcos Villasana. After seven rounds Hodkinson was ahead on points on all three judges scorecards, but was forced to retire in the eighth when he could no longer see through his swollen eyes. He had put up a solid and brave performance and proved beyond doubt that he is a world class fighter.

In October 1991 Hodkinson defended his European title and ko’d Guy Bellehigue in three rounds, before relinquishing it and concentrating on his pursuit of a world title; an objective he achieved when he comprehensively beat Villasana in a re-match in Belfast in 1991.

Hodkinson defended his title twice in 1992. After defeating a shopworn Steve Cruz in three rounds in April 1992, he travelled to France and stopped Fabrice Benichou in the 10th round of a tough fight. At the time of the stoppage, one judge had the fight level, the other two had Hoko ahead.

Perhaps the best performance of Hodkinson’s career was to stop Ricardo Cepeda in the fourth round (February 1993) for his third defence. Cepeda came with a good reputation, having failed on points to beat Villasana 18 months previously, a decision which was hotly disputed at the time. However Hodkinson never allowed the Puerto Rican to settle, hitting him with a barrage of combination punches until the referee intervened.

A match with the American Kevin Kelley and British fighter Colin McMillan were mooted but Hodkinson first had to deal with WBC mandatory challenger Goyo Vargas. He stopped Hodkinson in seven rounds. Hodkinson's next fight was another defeat; this time in a WBO title fight against the Welshman Steve Robinson, when he was stopped in the final round. Hodkinson never fought again.

Life after boxing
Hodkinson has been an ambassador for boxing and has appeared on A Question of Sport, Grandstand and has featured in openings with Muhammad Ali.

Personal life
Hodkinson lives in Kirkby and is father of four boys Kevin, Jason, Lewis and Dylan.

Professional boxing record

See also
List of world featherweight boxing champions
List of British world boxing champions
List of outright winners of the Lonsdale belt

References

External links

|-

1965 births
Living people
English male boxers
Boxers from Liverpool
World featherweight boxing champions
England Boxing champions
British Boxing Board of Control champions
European Boxing Union champions
World Boxing Council champions